Europa Hotel or Hotel Europa may refer to:

 Hotel Evropa, a former name of the Hotel Europe (Sarajevo), Bosnia and Herzegovina
 Hotel Europe (Vancouver), Canada
 Hotel Europa, in the Edificio Gonzalo Mejía, Medellín, Colombia
 Grand Hotel Evropa in Wenceslas Square, Czech Republic
 Europa Hotel, a former name of the Danhostel Copenhagen City, Denmark
 Europa Hotel, a former name of the London Marriott Hotel Grosvenor Square, Mayfair, London, England
 Europa Hotel, Cairo, Egypt; see 1996 Cairo shooting
 Europa Hotel, Belfast, Northern Ireland
 Hotel Europa Palace, Anacapri, Capri, Naples, Italy; see architect Gianfranco Frattini
 Hotel Europa (Venice), Italy, in Ca' Giustinian
 Hotel Europa (Maracaibo), in Venezuela

See also
 Hotel Evropeiskaya, Soviet-era name of the Grand Hotel Europe in Saint Petersburg, Russia
 Hotel Europe (disambiguation)